Brakel is a village in the Dutch province of Gelderland. It is a part of the municipality of Zaltbommel, and lies about 8 km east of Gorinchem.

Brakel was a separate municipality until 1999, when it became a part of Zaltbommel.

History 
It was first mentioned in 1212 as Brakel. The etymology is unclear. Brakel developed into an irregular esdorp. Later it became a linear dike village. The Protestant Church dates from the 15th century and has 14th century elements. The tower was severely damaged in 1944, and restored in 1950.

Slot Brakel was a castle from the 13th century. It was destroyed in 1672 by the French.
In 1768, Huis te Brakel was built on the grounds of the former castle, and the centre still contains the ruins of the medieval castle as part of a garden. In 1840, it was home to 1,096 people.

Gallery

References 

Municipalities of the Netherlands disestablished in 1999
Former municipalities of Gelderland
Populated places in Gelderland
Zaltbommel